The 1948 Rice Owls football team represented Rice University during the 1948 college football season. The Owls were led by ninth-year head coach Jess Neely and played their home games at Rice Field in Houston, Texas. Rice competed as a member of the Southwest Conference, finishing tied for third.

Schedule

References

Rice
Rice Owls football seasons
Rice Owls football